Mystus gulio, the Long Whiskers Catfish, is a species of catfish of the family Bagridae. The generic name is probably derived from the Latin "mystax", meaning "moustache", due to the long barbels.

It is found in India, Sri Lanka, Pakistan, Nepal and Vietnam. It is primarily a brackish water fish that enters and lives in fresh water.

The population is known to be decreasing in recent past, due to catching, pet trading and habitat destruction.

References 

Bagridae
Catfish of Asia
Fish of South Asia
Fish of Southeast Asia
Freshwater fish of India
Freshwater fish of Sri Lanka
Fish described in 1822